Qaina is the ninth month of the Mandaean calendar. Mandaeans practice light fasting on the first day of Qaina.

Qaina, which literally means 'reed', is the Mandaic name for the constellation Libra. It currently corresponds to Mar / Apr in the Gregorian calendar due to a lack of a leap year in the Mandaean calendar.

References

Months of the Mandaean calendar
Libra in astrology